This is a list of listed buildings in Orkney, Scotland. The list is split out by parish.

 List of listed buildings in Birsay And Harray, Orkney
 List of listed buildings in Cross And Burness, Orkney
 List of listed buildings in Eday, Orkney
 List of listed buildings in Evie And Rendall, Orkney
 List of listed buildings in Firth, Orkney
 List of listed buildings in Holm, Orkney
 List of listed buildings in Hoy And Graemsay, Orkney
 List of listed buildings in Kirkwall And St Ola, Orkney
 List of listed buildings in Kirkwall, Orkney
 List of listed buildings in Lady, Orkney
 List of listed buildings in Orphir, Orkney
 List of listed buildings in Papa Westray, Orkney
 List of listed buildings in Rousay And Egilsay, Orkney
 List of listed buildings in Sandwick, Orkney
 List of listed buildings in Shapinsay, Orkney
 List of listed buildings in South Ronaldsay, Orkney
 List of listed buildings in St Andrews And Deerness, Orkney
 List of listed buildings in Stenness, Orkney
 List of listed buildings in Stromness, Orkney
 List of listed buildings in Stronsay, Orkney
 List of listed buildings in Walls And Flotta, Orkney
 List of listed buildings in Westray, Orkney

For Category A listed buildings, see List of Category A listed buildings in Orkney

Orkney